Anna Hall (born 23 March 2001) is an American athlete specializing in the combined events. She won the bronze medal in the heptathlon at the 2022 World Athletics Championships. Hall is the North American indoor record holder for the pentathlon.

She is a two-time NCAA champion representing the University of Florida.

Professional
Anna Hall is a 2021 2021 NCAA high jump All-American to help the Georgia Bulldogs earn their NCAA Outdoor third place team finish.

She is a 2022 NCAA heptathlon champion, silver medalist in 400 metres hurdles to help the Florida Gators earn their first women's NCAA Outdoor Team Championship title, NCAA pentathlon champion to help Florida Gators track and field earn their second women's NCAA Indoor Team Championship title and on top of the podium for the second time since 1992.

She is a 2-time NCAA champion, 7-time NCAA Division 1 All-American, 2021 Southeastern Conference Pentathlon Champion, 8-time SEC finalist.

Hall won the 2022 World Athletics Championship heptathlon bronze medal, which was the first medal for the United States in over 20 years (Shelia Burrell earned also bronze in 2001).

On February 16, 2023, she obliterated the North American pentathlon record with a score of 5004 points at the U.S. Indoor Championships in Albuquerque, New Mexico. Becoming the third athlete in history to achieve 5000 points or more and moving up to the second place on the world all-time list, Hall just missed the world record of 5013 pts, set by Nataliya Dobrynska in 2012. At the same meet she later claimed the indoor 400 metres title running a new personal best time of 51.03.

Competition record

Sources:Anna Hall Track and Field Results Athletic.net

External links
 Anna Hall profile World Athletics
 Anna Hall profile Florida Gators
 Anna Hall profile USATF

References

2001 births
Living people
USA Outdoor Track and Field Championships winners
World Athletics Championships athletes for the United States
American heptathletes
Florida Gators women's track and field athletes
World Athletics Championships medalists
21st-century American women